Richard Wilde (28 October 1926 – 11 August 2000) was a New Zealand cricketer. He played in two first-class matches for Central Districts in 1951/52.

See also
 List of Central Districts representative cricketers

References

External links
 

1926 births
2000 deaths
New Zealand cricketers
Central Districts cricketers
People from Ōtaki, New Zealand